Omar Al Saqqaf (1923–1974) was a Saudi Arabian diplomat and politician who served as the minister of state for foreign affairs being the first Saudi to hold the post. He was among the leading officials of Saudi Arabia in foreign relations and one of the trusted envoys of King Faisal. He died in New York City while serving as the minister of state.

Early life and education
Al Saqqaf was born in Medina in 1923. His grandfather, Sayyid Omar Al Saqqaf, was a merchant in Jeddah dealing with the pilgrim trade. He received a degree in political science from the American University of Beirut.

Career
Following his graduation Al Saqqaf started his career at the Foreign Office of Saudi Arabia as the third secretary in 1948. From 1951 he assumed the post of acting charge d'affairs with the rank of counselor in different cities, including Karachi, Rome, Jakarta and London. He became chief of protocol at the Ministry of Foreign Affairs in 1956 and then, was named as the acting assistant undersecretary at the ministry. Next year, he was named as the Saudi Arabian ambassador to Ethiopia, and after serving in the post for one year, he was appointed deputy minister of foreign affairs. 

In April 1968 Al Saqqaf was named as the state minister for foreign affairs. He was one of the active Saudi Arabian officials during the establishment of the Gulf states as independent countries in 1971. Al Saqqaf was among the close advisors of King Faisal throughout his career. Al Saqqaf's term ended in November 1974 when he died, and he was succeeded by Prince Saud bin Faisal Al Saud in March 1975. In the period between November 1974 and March 1975 the ministry was headed by the acting minister Mohammed Ibrahim Massoud.

Personal life and death
Al Saqqaf was married and had three children. He had a good command of the English and French languages.

Al Saqqaf was attending the United Nations General Assembly on the Palestine issue in New York City when he died of a cerebral thrombosis at the Waldorf Astoria Hotel on 14 November 1974 at age 51. His body was brought back to Jeddah for burial.

Awards
Al Saqqaf was the recipient of the Nile Sash of Egypt which was awarded to him on 30 July 1974.

References

20th-century diplomats
Omar
1923 births
1974 deaths
Government ministers of Saudi Arabia
People from Medina
Ambassadors of Saudi Arabia to Ethiopia
Deaths from cerebral thrombosis
American University of Beirut alumni